Shinuacocha (possibly from Ancash Quechua shinwa nettle, qucha lake, "nettle lake") is a mountain in the Cordillera Negra in the Andes of Peru, about  high. It is situated in the Ancash Region, Bolognesi Province, Corpanqui District, and in the Ocros Province, Cajamarquilla District.

Sources 

Mountains of Peru
Mountains of Ancash Region
Lakes of Peru
Lakes of Ancash Region